Kim Young-hee is a Korean name consisting of the family name Lee and the given name Young-hee, and may also refer to:

 Lee Young-hee (designer) (1936-2018), South Korean designer
 Lee Young-hee (physicist) (born 1955), South Korean physicist
 Lee Young-hee (bureaucrat), South Korean bureaucrat and the 8th Commissioner of Korea Correctional Service